Bright Kanyontore Rwamirama is a Ugandan politician and retired army officer. He is the minister for animal industry in the Ugandan cabinet. He was appointed to that position on 1 June 2006. In the cabinet reshuffle of 16 February 2009, that of 27 May 2011, and that of 1 March 2015, he retained his cabinet post. He also serves as the elected Member of Parliament representing "Isingiro County North", Isingiro District. He has served in that capacity continuously since 2001. and he beat Posiono Mugyenyi in 2021 general election.

Background and education
Rwamirama was born in Isingiro District on 16 December 1954. Bright Rwamirama attended Omungyenyi Primary School for his elementary education, Mbarara High School for his O-Level education and Kololo High School for his A-Level studies. He holds the degrees of Bachelor of Business Administration (1996) and Master of Business Administration (2004), from Makerere University. His Certificate in Management was awarded in 1993, also by Makerere. He also attended the British Junior Staff College, studying the Junior Command and Staff Course and Naval Postgraduate School, studying the Resource Management Course. He obtained certificates from both courses.

Career
From 1978 until 1983, Rwamirama worked as a Banking Officer at Uganda Commercial Bank, the institution that later became Stanbic Bank Uganda. In 1983, he joined the National Resistance Army (NRA), in the Uganda Bush War to dislodge Milton Obote from power. He was appointed Officer in Charge of Pay in the NRA in 1986, serving in that capacity until 1989. In 1989, he was promoted to Director of Finance, in the NRA, which was renamed Uganda People's Defence Force (UPDF), in 1995. He served in that capacity at the UPDF headquarters, until 1997. He continued to serve as one of the Senior Staff Officers at UPDF Headquarters, until 2001. In 2001, he retired from the Armed Forces at the rank of lieutenant colonel. He joined politics, contesting for the parliamentary seat of "Isingiro County North", in Isingiro District. He won that seat and was re-elected to the same position in 2006 and 2011. He was appointed Minister of State for Animal Industry in June 2006, a position he still occupies as of March 2015.

Other considerations
Bright Rwamirama is married. He belongs to the National Resistance Movement political party. His interests include conflict resolution, community development and watching sports events.

See also
 Parliament of Uganda
 Cabinet of Uganda
 Isingiro District

References

External links
  Website of the Parliament of Uganda
 Full Cabinet List, May 2011

1954 births
Living people
Ugandan people
People from Isingiro District
Members of the Parliament of Uganda
Government ministers of Uganda
National Resistance Movement politicians
Ugandan military personnel
Makerere University alumni
People from Western Region, Uganda
Naval Postgraduate School alumni
People educated at Mbarara High School
21st-century Ugandan politicians